The Ultimate Experiment: Man-Made Evolution is a 1977 book by science writer Nicholas Wade about the then-new and controversial field of recombinant DNA research ("gene splicing"), much of it drawn from his earlier news and commentary as a writer for Science. An updated edition with a new chapter was published in 1979.

Citations

1977 non-fiction books
Books about science
Books by Nicholas Wade